Frank W. Mixter (December 30, 1878 - May 22, 1947) served in the California State Assembly for the 55th district from 1925 to 1931 and the California State Senate for the 32nd district from 1931 to 1947. During the Spanish–American War he served in the United States Army.

References

American military personnel of the Spanish–American War
Republican Party members of the California State Assembly
20th-century American politicians
1873 births
1947 deaths
Republican Party California state senators